Alex de Grassi (born February 13, 1952) is an American fingerstyle guitarist. Tom Wheeler wrote in Guitar Player magazine that his technique is "the kind that shoves fellow pickers to the cliff of decision: should I practice like a madman or chuck it altogether?" De Grassi was invited by his cousin William Ackerman to join the Windham Hill label and became one of the label's best sellers.

Guitars
De Grassi uses various guitars. Currently his primary touring/recording guitars are a custom Lowden F35c maple with a European spruce top and a custom Traugott R model Brazilian Rosewood with German spruce top. Other favorites are a custom Carlson sympitar (twelve sympathetic strings) maple with spruce top and a custom McCollum baritone (28" scale) paduk with Italian spruce top.

Discography
 Turning: Turning Back, (Windham Hill, 1978)
 Slow Circle, (Windham Hill, 1979)
 Clockwork, (Windham Hill, 1981)
 Southern Exposure, (Windham Hill, 1983)
 Altiplano, (RCA/Novus, 1987)
 Deep at Night, (Windham Hill, 1991)
 A Windham Hill Retrospective, (Windham Hill, 1992; Valley Entertainment reissue, 2010)
 The World's Getting Loud, (Windham Hill, 1993)
 Beyond the Night Sky: Lullabies for Guitar, (EarthBeat, 1996)
 Alex de Grassi's Interpretation of Simon & Garfunkel, (Northsound, 1997)
 Alex de Grassi's Interpretation of James Taylor, (NorthSound, 1998)
 The Water Garden, (Tropo, 1998)
 Bolivian Blues Bar, (Narada, 1999)
 Tatamonk with Quique Cruz, (Tropo, 2000)
 Shortwave Postcard with G.E. Stinson, (Auditorium, 2001)
 Now & Then: Folk Songs for the 21st Century, (33rd Street, 2003)
 Pure Alex de Grassi, (Windham Hill, 2006)
 The Bridge, (Tropo, 2020)

References

External links

Official DEMANIA site
Interview at Strings By Mail

Chamber jazz guitarists
Fingerstyle guitarists
1952 births
Living people
Windham Hill Records artists
Musicians from the San Francisco Bay Area
Blue Coast Records artists
American male guitarists
People from Yokosuka, Kanagawa
20th-century American guitarists
Guitarists from California
20th-century American male musicians
American male jazz musicians